Dominair was a passenger airline based in Santiago de los Caballeros, Dominican Republic, that had offered flights to Port-au-Prince, Haiti, until 2007. Before that it was a popular airline with regular flights from Santiago de los Caballeros to San Juan, Puerto Rico, using two de Havilland Canada Dash 8 airplanes. The airline is now defunct and previously only flew to Port-au-Prince and had a fleet composed of two leased L-410 Turbolet aircraft.

Code data

IATA Code: YU
ICAO Code: ADM
Callsign: Dominair

Fleet
2 L-410 Turbolet (Leased from SAP Air)

Previously:
1  Martin 404 (Owned HI-334)
2 de Havilland Canada Dash 8 (Leased from LIAT)
3 de Havilland Canada Dash 8 Operated by Liat 1974 (based in Antigua)

References

Defunct airlines of the Dominican Republic
Airlines disestablished in 2007